Mike Beltz is an American politician serving as a member of the North Dakota House of Representatives from the 20th district. Elected in November 2018, he assumed office on December 1, 2020.

Education 
Beltz earned a Bachelor of Science degree in animal science from North Dakota State University.

Career 
Outside of politics, Beltz has worked as a farmer. He was also the chair of the North Dakota Ag Coalition and the North Dakota State Board of Agricultural Research and Education. Beltz was elected to the North Dakota House of Representatives in November 2020 and assumed office on December 1, 2020.

References 

Living people
North Dakota State University alumni
Republican Party members of the North Dakota House of Representatives
Year of birth missing (living people)